Kir Lake (French: Lac Kir) is an artificial lake located south west of Dijon, France.  Traversed by the Ouche, it was completed in 1964 and named after Félix Kir (1876–1968), the mayor of Dijon and the lake's creator.

External links

Artificial lakes
Lakes of Bourgogne-Franche-Comté
Bourgogne-Franche-Comté region articles needing translation from French Wikipedia